Sherryl Woods (born July 23, 1944 in Arlington, Virginia, United States) is an American writer of over 110 romance and mystery novels since 1982. She also signed her novels as "Alexandra Kirk" and "Suzanne Sherrill". She splits her time between Colonial Beach, Virginia and Florida.

Biography
Sherryl Woods born on July 23, 1944 in Arlington, Virginia, United States. She graduated from Ohio State University with a degree in Journalism. She worked for several newspapers covering everything from suburban government to entertainment, eventually specializing in television, she became the television editor for papers in Ohio and Florida. She served as president of the guild for Miami City Ballet for three terms.

Sherryl published her first romance novels in 1982 as "Alexandra Kirk" and "Suzanne Sherrill", in 1985 she published her first book as "Sherryl Woods". In 1986, she left her work of journalist, and now she writes full-time. She also writes two mystery series by fictional sleuths; Molly DeWitt and Amanda Roberts

Bibliography

Stand alone novels
Restoring Love (1982) (writing as Suzanne Sherrill)
Sand Castles (1983) (writing Alexandra Kirk)
Desirable Compromise (1984) (writing as Suzanne Sherrill)
Thrown for a Loss (1984)
Images of Love (1986) (writing Alexandra Kirk)
Not at Eight, Darling (1986)
Yesterday's Love (1986)
Come Fly with Me (1987)
A Gift of Love (1987)
Safe Harbor (1987)
Never Let Go (1988)
Edge of Forever (1988)
In Too Deep (1989)
Heartland (1989)
Miss Liz's Passion (1989)
Tea and Destiny (1990)
Fever Pitch (1991)
My Dearest Cal (1991)
Joshua and the Cowgirl (1991)
Dream Mender (1992)
The Parson's Waiting (1994)
One Step Away (1994)
Temptation (1996)
Twilight (1997)
Amazing Gracie (1998)
After Tex (1999)
Angel Mine (2000)
The Adam's Dynasty (2002)
Bachelor-and Baby! (2003)
Flamingo Diner (2003)
Mending Fences (2007)

And Baby Makes Three
A Christmas Blessing (1995)
Natural Born Daddy (1995)
The Cowboy and His Baby (1996)
The Rancher and His Unexpected Daughter (1996)
The Littlest Angel (1997)
Natural Born Trouble (1998)
Unexpected Mummy (1998)
The Cowboy and the Unexpected Wedding (1998)
Natural Born Lawman (1998)
The Unclaimed Baby (1999)
The Cowboy and His Wayward Bride (1999)
Suddenly, Annie's Father (1999)

Second Chance at Love
A Kiss Away (1986)
A Prince Among Men (1986)
All For Love (1986)
Two's Company (1987)
Best Intentions (1987)
Prince Charming Replies (1988)

This Time Forever
Can't Say No (1988)
One Touch of Moondust (1989)
Next Time...Forever (1990)

Amanda Roberts
Reckless (1989)
Body and Soul (1989)
Stolen Moments (1990)
Ties That Bind (1991)
Bank On It (1993)
Hide and Seek (1993)
Wages of Sin (1994)
Deadly Obsession (1995)
White Lightning (1995)

Molly DeWitt
Hot Property (1992)
Hot Secrets (1992)
Hot Money (1993)
Hot Schemes (1994)

Vows
Love (1992)
Honor (1992)
Cherish (1992)
Kate's Vow(1993)
A Daring Vow (1993)
 A Vow to Love (1994)

Bridal Path
A Ranch for Sara (1997)
Ashley's Rbel (1997)
Danielle's Daddy Factor (1997)

And Baby Makes Three: Delacourt's of Texas
The Cowboy and the New Year's Baby (1999)
Dylan and the Baby Doctor (2000)
The Pint-sized Secret (2000)
Marrying a Delacourt (2000)
The Delacourt Scandal (2000)

Woman's Way
A Love Beyond Words (2001)

Calamity Janes
Do You Take this Rebel?(2001)
Courting the Enemy (2001)
To Catch a Thief (2001)
The Calamity Janes (2001)
Wrangling the Redhead (2001)

Trinity Harbor
About That Man (2001)
Ask Anyone (2002)
Along Came Trouble (2002)

Devaneys
Ryan's Place (2002)
Sean's Reckoning (2002)
Michael's Discovery (2003)
Patrick's Destiny (2003)
Daniel's Desire (2003)

Million-Dollar Destinies
Isn't It Rich? (2004)
Priceless (2004)
Treasured (2004)
Destiny Unleashed (2004)

Charleston Trilogy
The Backup Plan (2005)
Flirting with Disaster (2005)
Waking Up in Charleston (2006)

Rose Cottage Sisters
Three Down the Aisle (2005)
What's Cooking (2005)
The Laws of Attraction (2005)
For the Love of Pete (2005)
Home at Rose Cottage (2010)- reissue collects Three Down the Aisle & What's Cooking in one volume
Return to Rose Cottage (2010)- reissue collects The Laws of Attraction & For the Love of Pete in one volume

Sweet Magnolias

Stealing Home (2007)
A Slice of Heaven (2007)
Feels Like Family (2007)
Welcome to Serenity (2008)
Home in Carolina (2010)
Sweet Tea at Sunrise (2010)
Honeysuckle Summer (2010)
Midnight Promises (2012)
Catching Fireflies (2012)
Where Azaleas Bloom (2012)
Swan Point (July 29, 2014)

Seaview Key
 Seaview Inn (2008)
 Home to Seaview Key (1/28/2014)

Chesapeake Shores

The Inn at Eagle Point (2009)
Flowers on Main (2009)
Harbor Lights (2009)
A Chesapeake Shores Christmas (2010)
Driftwood Cottage (2011)
Moonlight Cove (2011)
Beach Lane (2011)
An O'Brien Family Christmas (2011)
The Summer Garden (2012)
A Seaside Christmas (2013)
The Christmas Bouquet (10/07/2014)
Dogwood Hill (12/30/2014)
Willow Brook Road (2015)
Lilac Lane (2017)

Ocean Breeze
Sand Castle Bay (2013)
Wind Chime Point (2013)
Sea Glass Island (2013)

Omnibuses
So This Is Christmas (2004) (with Leanne Banks, Beverly Barton and Margot Early)
Dashing Through the Mall (2006) (with Darlene Gardner and Holly Jacobs)
That Holiday Feeling (2009) (with Debbie Macomber and Robyn Carr)
Summer Brides (2010) (with Susan Mallery and Susan Wiggs)

Other books
The Sweet Magnolias' Cookbook (2012)

References

External links
Sherryl Woods's Official Website
Sherryl Woods's Webpage in Harlequin Enterprises Ltd's Website
Sherryl Woods's Webpage in Fantastic Fiction's Website

20th-century American novelists
21st-century American novelists
American romantic fiction writers
American women novelists
1944 births
Living people
People from Arlington County, Virginia
Novelists from Virginia
Ohio State University School of Communication alumni
Women romantic fiction writers
20th-century American women writers
21st-century American women writers
People from Colonial Beach, Virginia